John James Doohan,  (25 February 1920 – 16 June 2007) was an Australian politician. He was a National Party member of the New South Wales Legislative Council from 1978 to 1991.

Doohan was born in Bourke, New South Wales, and was educated at St Joseph's College, Hunters Hill before becoming a grazier at Louth. He served in the 2nd Australian Imperial Force from 1942 to 1945 and in the 18th Ord Ammo Coy in New Guinea. He married Mena Beryl, with whom he had two children. He was a member of the Central Council (1957–78), including two periods as Vice-President (1965–68, 1971–73) and one as Treasurer (1969–71). He was also involved in many committees and organisations to do with the wool farming industry.

In 1978, he was elected to the New South Wales Legislative Council for the National Party. He was Vice-Chairman of the NSW National Party from 1979 to 1982, and served in the council until 1991.

References

1920 births
2007 deaths
National Party of Australia members of the Parliament of New South Wales
Members of the New South Wales Legislative Council
Australian Officers of the Order of the British Empire
20th-century Australian politicians
Australian Army personnel of World War II